Nicole Yongju Jung (born October 7, 1991), referred to as Nicole, is an American singer based in South Korea. She is a member of South Korean girl group Kara. Her solo debut mini album, First Romance, was released on November 19, 2014.

Biography
Jung was born on October 7, 1991 in Glendale, California to Korean parents. She attended Mark Keppel Elementary School and Toll Middle School in Glendale, California. She participated in choir, drill team, played the violin for 4 years and took dance classes. She auditioned for DSP Media by sending a video of her singing an Ivy and Black Eyed Peas song. Jung made the decision to go to South Korea and experienced hardships such as adjusting to the culture and missing her friends. She accepted DSP's offer, her mom moved with her to South Korea and has opened up a Korean BBQ restaurant called "Aura The Grill".

Jung was on a show called "KAIST" which was renamed to "Nicole The Entertainer's Introduction to Veterinary Science" in Konkuk University. The first episode aired on November 12, 2009. She "graduated" from college in January 2010.

Career

2007–2013: Kara 

Jung debuted as the youngest member in Kara on March 29, 2007, with their single "Break It", alongside Park Gyuri, Han Seungyeon, and Kim Sunghee. In May, Sunghee departed from the group, and two members were added in July – Goo Hara and Kang Jiyoung.

On December 4, 2008, Kara released their 2nd mini-album "Pretty Girl", and in February 2009 came the follow-up album "Honey"; the latter's title track of the same name became the group's first #1 single on music shows when it topped M! Countdown and The Music Trend. In late July 2009, Kara released their second album named "Revolution". Owing to the popularity of the songs "Wanna" and "Mister", the group's overall popularity increased, and they followed with their third mini-album "Lupin".

In August 2010, Kara officially debuted in Japan with a Japanese version of their 2009 Korean single "Mister". After this, Kara released their fourth mini-album Jumping in South Korea in November 2010.

On January 19, 2011, Jung announced, alongside fellow members Kang Jiyoung and Han Seung-yeon, that they were terminating their contract with DSP through court. On April 28, 2011, the dispute between DSP Media and Kara's 3 members was officially announced as resolved.

Jung injured her ankle during Kara's first stand-alone concert in Korea, which was held on February 18, 2012. She was performing a solo performance cover of Michael Jackson's "Beat It", when she hurt her ankle while leaving through a lift. After she got hurt, she did limp a little during performances but she still finished the concert. Afterwards in the dressing room, she received acupuncture for her injury. Despite her injury, she still performed on the very next day. Afterwards, Jung's injury was publicly revealed as she was photographed at airports in a wheelchair. Despite her injury, Nicole still hosted  SBS "Inkigayo" with a cast on her leg. Owing to the ankle injury, she was unable to perform in group performance choreography during their Speed Up promotion in Japan from March to April 2012.

Kara has released Kara Collection in 2012, both in South Korea and Japan, an album containing each of the girls' solo songs. Jung's song was "Lost", which featured close friend Jinwoon.

Jung performed with the group for the last time at the 2013 MBC Gayo Daejejeon on December 31, 2013. The group performed a medley of their past hit singles along with "Damaged Lady", from the group's fourth album Full Bloom.

2014: First Romance
On January 13, 2014, it was announced that Jung would be withdrawing from the group due to the expiration of her contract with DSP Media, and that she would be flying to the States for two months to focus on improving her vocal and dance skills while preparing to make a solo debut.

On October 14, 2014, Jung signed an exclusive contract with B2M Entertainment. The agency revealed, "Following the end of her contract with DSP Media, Nicole is currently preparing for her solo debut after confirming a new agency and completing the contract signing. Nicole's new agency was established by CEO Gil Jong Hwa, who had been with KARA from their debut to their peak. Since their connection under DSP Media, they have maintained close relations with one another."

Jung's solo debut mini album, First Romance was released on November 19, 2014, and the title song MAMA, which was used to promote the mini album.
First Romance in November sold 8,754 copies. By the end of 2014, the mini album had sold 10,137 copies.

2015–present: Japanese debut with "Something Special", Bliss EP, and new agency
On April 22, 2015, it was revealed that Jung would debut in Japan on June 24. She performed her debut song before release at the 'KCON 2015 Japan X M! Chttp://series-top.com/new-showsountdown'. On June 17, she released a short PV of her debut single "Something Special". On June 24, Jung released the PV for "Something Special".

In December 2015, Jung released news that she would be coming back in Japan with her second Japanese single in 2016. It was revealed that the single would be called "Don't Stop" to be released on February 17. On January 16, she released a short PV version of "Don't Stop"

On March 2, 2016, Jung revealed on her Instagram that she would be releasing her first solo Japanese album, titled Bliss on April 27, 2016. The title track from the album is titled "HAPPY", the PV teaser was released on March 31, 2016. She had her first solo concerts titled "2016 Nicole The 1st Live" spanning two days, April 29, 2016, and May 1, 2016. She end her contract with CJ Victor in 2016 & B2M in 2017. She joined Diamond Music for her Japanese promotions.

In 2020, Jung opened a YouTube channel.

2022–present: New agency 
In July 2022, Jung decided to sign with new label JWK Entertainment.  It was also announced that she will return with the digital single "You.F.O" on July 27.

In February 2023, the agency will release a new digital single "Mysterious" which is scheduled for March 9.

Other activities
Jung was featured on former DSP Media artist Sunha's first album Fahrenheit in the song "String" (2008). In April 2009, she sang a duet with former Noel member Kang Kyun-seong called "Happy And". In August 2009, she and singer Jay Park became part of historical culture variety show Nodaji, replacing Choi Min-yong and Kim Tae-hyun. The show was eventually cancelled due to low ratings in October 2009.

In September 2009, Jung was featured in numerous live performances of Mighty Mouth's single "Love Class". In July 2010, she sang a duet with Park Myung Soo for his single "Whale" (고래).

Jung was a member of "Dazzling Red", one of the idol project groups for the 2012 SBS Korean Music Festival – The Color of K-Pop concert with fellow idols After School's Nana, 4Minute's Hyuna, Secret's Hyoseong, and SISTAR's Hyorin. Dazzling Red released a single, "This Person", in December 2012.

Jung was invited to the 2013 MTV Video Music Awards Japan (as the only Korean artist invited that year) on June 22, 2013, and performed her solo song "Lost" from Kara Collection.

Discography

Studio albums

EPs

Singles

As lead artist

As featured artist

Other appearances

Video albums

Filmography

Film

Television drama

Variety and reality shows

Events shows hosting

Bibliography

Awards

References

External links

 Nicole at B2M Entertainment 

1991 births
American expatriates in South Korea
American musicians of Korean descent
Kara (South Korean group) members
Konkuk University alumni
Living people
Musicians from Los Angeles County, California
Japanese-language singers of the United States
Korean-language singers of the United States
K-pop singers
South Korean female idols
South Korean dance musicians
South Korean rhythm and blues singers
South Korean women pop singers
South Korean television actresses
South Korean television presenters
South Korean women television presenters
South Korean radio presenters
DSP Media artists
CJ Victor Entertainment artists
21st-century American singers
21st-century South Korean women singers
South Korean women radio presenters
B2M Entertainment artists